Dorothy C. Wanderman (October 20, 1897 – July 1988) was an American composer and pianist who was born in New York. She studied music with Isidor Philipp and David Saperton. She married Dr. Seymour Wanderman and they had two daughters, Helene and Carol.

Wanderman socialized with composer Leopold Godowksy, who was the father-in-law of her teacher Saperton. Godowsky dedicated his composition Waltz Poem No. 2 to her. Wanderman was a member of the American Society of Composers, Authors and Publishers (ASCAP). Her music was published by the Boston Music Company, and includes the following works for piano:
In a French Cafe
In a Vietnamese Garden
Playful Mouse
Playtime March
Swiss Alpine Waltz

References 

American women composers
1897 births
1988 deaths
Place of death missing
20th-century American pianists
20th-century American women pianists
Musicians from New York (state)